Josephine Humphreys (born February 2, 1945) is an American novelist.

Early life
Josephine Humphreys grew up in Charleston, South Carolina with her mother, father and two sisters (Vinh). Her father worked as the director of the Charleston development board. Her mother worked for the Charleston Museum (Josephine Humphreys full-length interview for Envision SC). Humphreys was encouraged to write by her grandmother Neta, and later by her mother. All the books she read were inherited from her grandparents or came from the public library (Vinh). The all-girl school she attended had an excellent writing program and a literary magazine, according to Humphreys. After graduating from high school, she attended Duke University because her father believed it was a "southern college" and he was against her attending any "northern school." What her father did not realize, though, was that Duke was anything but the "southern school" he imagined (Josephine Humphreys full-length interview for Envision SC).  Her class was the first racially integrated undergraduate class. For four years this didn't seem to be an issue, until their graduation day, when there was a bomb threat from the Ku Klux Klan, resulting in Humphreys' class canceling its graduation ceremony.

Career
A native of Charleston, South Carolina, which is also the setting of her novels Dreams of Sleep, Rich in Love and The Fireman's Fair, Humphreys was educated at Ashley Hall (Class of 1963), studied creative writing with Reynolds Price at Duke University (A.B., 1967), and went on to attend Yale University (M.A., 1968) and the University of Texas. She held fellowships from the Woodrow Wilson Foundation and the Danforth Foundation.  From 1970 to 1977, before beginning her writing career, she taught English in Charleston.

While her first three novels are mainly about contemporary family life in the South, her fourth, Nowhere Else on Earth, is a departure in that it is an historical novel based on the true story of Rhoda Strong and Henry Berry Lowrie from the American Civil War era.  It won the Southern Book Award in 2001.

Rich in Love, probably her best-known novel, was made into a 1992 film of the same title directed by Bruce Beresford, from a screenplay by Alfred Uhry, starring Albert Finney and Jill Clayburgh.

Humphreys was the winner of the 1984 Hemingway Foundation/PEN Award for Dreams of Sleep, and the recipient of a Guggenheim Fellowship, the Lyndhurst Prize, and the American Academy of Arts and Letters Award in Literature.

Novel Inspiration
Many of Humphreys' novels have been inspired not only by the landscape of Charleston but also from her own life. Many of her characters represent a personal metaphor(Vinh). Most books represent a form of family and community because that was important to Humphreys. Most importantly they reflect Charleston and how its changed from when she was a child to now. One book in particular, Fireman's Fair was rewritten in three months because of the hurricane and its significant impact on the landscape(Magee).

Novels
Dreams of Sleep (1984)
Rich in Love (1987)
The Fireman's Fair (1991)
Nowhere Else on Earth (2000)

See also
Southern literature
Fellowship of Southern Writers

References

  Josephine Humphreys Full Length Interview for Envision SC. 2013, https://www.youtube.com/watch?v=yr7rF3qsdcQ.
Magee, Rosemary M. “Continuity and Separation: An Interview with Josephine Humphreys.” The Southern Review, vol. 27, no. 4, 1991 Autumn 1991, pp. 792–802. mzh.
Vinh, Alphonse. “Talking with Josephine Humphreys.” The Southern Quarterly: A Journal of the Arts in the South, vol. 32, no. 4, 1994 Summer 1994, pp. 131–40. mzh.

20th-century American novelists
Writers from Charleston, South Carolina
Angier B. Duke Scholars
Duke University alumni
Yale University alumni
1945 births
Living people
Hemingway Foundation/PEN Award winners
American women novelists
20th-century American women writers
Writers of American Southern literature
Novelists from South Carolina
21st-century American women